A nation is a unified social community.

Nation, Nations or The Nation may also refer to:

Geography
 The Nation, Ontario, Canada, a municipality
 Nation River (British Columbia), Canada
 Nation Lakes, four lakes along that river
 Nation Mountain, a mountain to the north of one of those lakes
 Nation Peak, British Columbia, Canada
 Nation (Paris Métro and RER), a station in Paris

People
 Nation (surname)
 Nation (wrestler), ring name of American professional wrestler Sesugh Uhaa

Film and TV
 The Nation with David Speers, a defunct Australian news program
 The Nation (TV series), an Australian comedy series

Books and publications
 Nation (novel), by Terry Pratchett

Newspapers
 Daily Nation, a Kenyan daily newspaper
 Nation (Australia), a former Australian fortnightly journal, published 1958–1972
 The Nation, a United States magazine founded in 1865
 The Nation (Irish newspaper), a former Irish nationalist newspaper founded in the 1840s
 The Nation (Malawi), a daily paper print and online from Malawi
 The Nation (Nigeria), a Nigerian newspaper
 The Nation (Pakistan), an English-language newspaper in Pakistan
 The Nation (Sri Lanka), an English-language weekly newspaper in Sri Lanka
 The Nation (Thailand), an English-language newspaper in Thailand

 The Daily Nation (Barbados), a daily newspaper established in 1973
 The Nation and Athenaeum, a former weekly paper in the United Kingdom, merged into the New Statesman in 1931

Music
 Nation Records, a record label

Albums
 N.A.T.I.O.N. (2019), an album by Bad Wolves
 Nation (Dr. Acula album) (2012)
 Nation (Sepultura album) (2001)

Songs
 "Nations", a song by Angels of Light from Everything Is Good Here/Please Come Home (2003)

Other uses
 Nation (nightclub), a nightclub in Washington, D.C.
 Nation, a nightclub in Liverpool, England which hosted Cream (nightclub)
 Nation, a series of Singapore public gay parties
 Nation (university), a historical association of students based on their birthplace or ethnicity

See also
 Nation's Giant Hamburgers, a restaurant chain in California
 Nation state, a geopolitical entity 
 National (disambiguation)
 The National (disambiguation)
 Nationality (disambiguation)

Lists of newspapers